Troy Thomas Kyles (born August 13, 1968) is a former professional American football wide receiver in the National Football League (NFL). He attended Howard University. He was with the New York Giants in 1990 and the San Francisco 49ers in 1992.

References

1968 births
Living people
Sportspeople from Lorain, Ohio
American football wide receivers
Howard Bison football players
New York Giants players
San Francisco 49ers players
Players of American football from Ohio
Saint Martin de Porres High School (Detroit) alumni